Natasha Lako (born 13 May 1948) is an Albanian poet and novelist. She belongs to the country's first generation of women writers.

Lako studied political science at Tirana University, specializing in journalism. She has also worked at the New Albania Film Studios in Tirana. Together with Diana Çuli and Helena Kadare, she was one of the few women writers during the Albanian communist regime. From 1991 to 1993, she was elected as a member of the Democratic Party in the coalition government. In 1997, she became the first director of the Albanian Film Archives, working there for a number of years.

Natasha Lako, who has also worked as a screenwriter, is married to the Albanian actor and film director Mevlan Shanaj. They have two children, Hera and Joni.

Works

Poetry
1972: Marsi brenda nesh (March within us)
1979: E para fjalë e botës (The world's first word)
1984: Këmisha e pranverës (The spring shirt)
1986: Yllësia e fjalëve (Constellation of words)
1990: Natyrë e qetë (Quiet nature)
1995: Thesi me pëllumba (The bag of doves)                                 Perkthim i Tomas Transtromer ( dy ribotime) Qielli pergjysem dhe Perandoria e barit                             Lekura e ujit- Permbledhje poetike
2016 Kunderperfyterimi 
Novels 
1977: Stinët e jetës'' (The seasons of life).                               Esse    Energjia filmike                15 films screenplay

References

External links
English translations of Lako's poetry from Robert Elsie's Albanian Literature in Translation

1948 births
Living people
20th-century Albanian poets
Albanian women novelists
Albanian novelists
Albanian women writers
People from Korçë
Albanian women poets
University of Tirana alumni
21st-century Albanian poets
20th-century Albanian women writers
21st-century Albanian women writers